The Ashanti Empire was governed by an elected monarch with its political power centralised. The entire government was a federation. By the 19th century, the Empire had a total population of 3 million. The Ashanti society was matrilineal as most families were extended and were headed by a male elder who was assisted by a female elder. Asante twi was the most common and official language. At its peak from the 18th–19th centuries, the Empire extended from the Komoé River (Ivory Coast) in the West to the Togo Mountains in the East.

The king and the aristocracy were the highest social class in the Ashanti society. Commoners were below the aristocracy with slaves forming the lowest social order. The Ashanti celebrated various ceremonies which were compulsory for communal participation. Festivals served as a means of promoting unity, remembering the ancestors and for thanksgiving. There was the belief in a single supreme being who created the universe with a decentralized system of smaller gods below this supreme being. People of all classes believed in witchcraft and magic. The Ashanti medical system was largely herbal similar to the Traditional African medicine of other pre-colonial African societies.

Society 

Thomas Edward, in 1817, identified two classes in the empire. He referred to the upper class as "higher orders". Some owned large estates and thousands of slaves. "They were courteous, well-mannered, dignified and proud of their honor to such an extent a social disgrace, including something unintended as public flatulence could drive a man to commit suicide." Men and women of higher orders bathed every morning with soap and warm water. They cleared their teeth several times every day with a brushing stick. They were also described as ungrateful, insolent and licentious. Historian Edgerton describes the wealth of Ashanti in the mid 19th century where he states it was not uncommon for members who worked with the royal administration to possess over £100,000 in gold. He recounts that such upper class Ashanti possessed more wealth than most upper class British families in the mid 19th century.
 
The Ashanti state was matrilineal with all Ashanti citizens tracing their lineage to a single ancestor in an unbroken female line. The  was more concerned about the affairs of women and girls in the family. A mother's brother was the legal guardian of her children. The father had fewer legal responsibilities for his children with the exception of ensuring their well-being and to pay for a suitable wife for his son. A husband had some legal rights over his wife, including the right to cut off; her nose for adultery, her lips for betraying a secret or her ears for listening to private conversation. Women had relative equality such as the right to initiate divorce. Menstruation was detested in Ashanti society. Women were secluded in huts during menses.

Clothing 

Edgerton comments that prominent people in the empire often wore silk as commoners wore cotton whiles slaves dressed in black cloth. Garments indicated the wearer's rank, and their color denoted various meanings. Lighter colors as stated by Edgerton, could express innocence or rejoicing. White for example, was worn by Chiefs after making a sacrifice or by ordinary people after winning a court case. Dark colors were worn for funerals or mourning. Most clothes bore intricate designs that carried out various meanings.

Some women wore Kente cloth dresses made by stitching together numerous handwoven strips of cotton or silk. There were laws that restricted certain Kente designs to various great men and women as exclusive symbols of their mobility and prestige. Some cotton or silk patterns on the Kente were designed solely for the Asantehene or king and could only be worn with his permission. The king and the wealthy wore elegant sandals decorated with gold but Edgerton writes that commoners went barefoot except during the rainy season when they wore wooden clogs to keep their feet out of the mud. The Densinkran was a form of hairstyle introduced in the Ashanti Empire to mourn the Ashanti soldiers who perished at the Katamanso War. The hairstyle was later worn by women of royal descent and the elderly. It was also worn during funerals.

Cuisine 
Plants cultivated by the Ashanti include plantains, yams, manioc, corn, sweet potatoes, millet, beans, onions, peanuts, tomatoes, and many fruits. Fufu was an important dish in the empire. Women collected snails which formed a major part of Ashanti cuisine. Cultural exchange with the Europeans at the coast introduced foreign dishes in Ashanti. The Asantehene or king of Ashanti enjoyed as part of his breakfast, European biscuits and tea. Maize could be used to prepare porridge or loaf. Fritz Ramseyer accounts for the consumption of maize diet by the Ashanti army in 1869. Kenkey was documented in the early 19th century by the William Hutton and the emissaries of Joseph Dupuis. Cassava could be used to prepare Kokonte and rice was imported further south in modern Ghana. Rice was the main meal taken by the Asantehene and his officials at 2pm. Scholar Miller writes on the lower consumption of meat by Ashanti people outside of the royal court. She cites William Hutton in 1820 who observed the presence of poultry, sheep and hogs of which the Ashanti lower class preferred to sell as they could not afford such diet.

Games 
The Oware is an abstract strategy game widely believed to be of Ashanti origin. People sat under the shade provided by huge trees along the street where they played the board game.

Slavery 
Slaves were typically taken as captives from enemies in warfare. The welfare of Ashanti slaves varied from being able to acquire wealth and intermarry with the master's family to being sacrificed in funeral ceremonies. The Ashanti sacrificed slaves upon the death of their masters. The Ashanti believed that slaves would follow their masters into the afterlife. Slaves could sometimes own other slaves, and could also request a new master for severe mistreatment.

The modern-day Ashanti claim that slaves were seldom abused, and that a person who abused a slave was held in high contempt by society. In addition to slaves, there were pawns; these were individuals of free status sold into servitude as a means of paying a debt.  Kwaku Dua I banned this practice of pawnship around 1838.

Art

Architecture 

The Ashanti traditional buildings are the only surviving buildings of Ashanti architecture. The construction and design of most Ashanti houses consisted of a timber framework filled up with clay which were thatched with sheaves of leaves. The surviving designated sites are shrines, but there have been many other buildings in the past with the same architectural style. These buildings served as palaces and shrines as well as houses for the affluent. The Ashanti Empire also built mausoleums which housed the tombs of several Ashanti leaders.
Generally, houses whether designed for human habitation or for the deities, consisted of four separate rectangular single-room buildings set around an open courtyard; the inner corners of adjacent buildings were linked by means of splayed screen walls, whose sides and angles could be adapted to allow for any inaccuracy in the initial layout. Typically, three of the buildings were completely open to the courtyard, while the fourth was partially enclosed, either by the door and windows, or by open-work screens flanking an opening. The walls of temples and that of important buildings were designed with reliefs and sculptures. Incised patterns, low reliefs and perforated fretwork are listed among the types of reliefs employed in Ashanti architecture by Livingstone.

The palace complex 
The  palace was the palace of the Asantehene or King of Ashanti until its destruction during the Anglo-Ashanti War. The  was constructed with stone. It was located at the centre of Kumasi and was completed by Asantehene Osei Bonsu in 1822. According to Curnow, The building consisted of a tower, paved inner courtyard, window shutters and decorative balustrades. The stone palace formed part of a larger palace complex that was secluded by a high wall, first described by Bowdich in the early 19th century. The palace complex covered about 5 acres and it contained several courtyards with verandas and more than 60 rooms. Certain palace courtyards could contain up to 300 people. Bowdich mentioned the "King's garden" as a part of the palace complex in 1817, which was "an area equal to one of the large squares in London." Included in this garden were 4 large parasols and a dinner table which were used for state banquets.
 
One part of the  housed the wine store while most served the purpose of displaying the Asantehene's collection of arts and crafts. These articles included candle-shades, glass tumblers and wine glasses. According to Winwood Reade in 1874, “We went to the king’s palace, which consists of many courtyards, each surrounded with alcoves and verandahs, and having two gates or doors, so that each yard was a thoroughfare . . . But the part of the palace fronting the street was a stone house, Moorish in its style . . . with a flat roof and a parapet, and suites of apartments on the first floor. It was built by Fanti masons many years ago. The rooms upstairs remind me of Wardour Street. Each was a perfect Old Curiosity Shop. Books in many languages, Bohemian glass, clocks, silver plate, old furniture, Persian rugs, Kidderminster carpets, pictures and engravings, numberless chests and coffers. A sword bearing the inscription From Queen Victoria to the King of Ashantee. A copy of the Times, 17 October 1843. With these were many specimens of Moorish and Ashanti handicraft.”

Goldweights 

Gold was an fundamental part of Ashanti art. The Ashanti just like all Akan kingdoms, used goldweights called  to measure gold dust. Most goldweights are miniature representations of West African cultural items such as the adinkra symbols, plants, animals and people. The earliest weights have been dated from 1400–1700 AD. The weights were carved and cast through the lost wax technique.

Festivals 

The chiefs were responsible for directing the Adae, a religious ceremony approximately every 3 weeks during which the ancestors were praised and celebrated. During the Adae, the community drank palm wine and danced to the rhythm of dozens of drums. The Adae Kese ceremony was another important event in Ashanti. The custom of holding this festival came into prominence between 1697 and 1699 when statehood was achieved for the people of Ashante after the war of independence, at the Battle of Feyiase, against the Denkyira. It was a time to consecrate the remains of dead kings kept in a mausoleum at Bantama. Rituals included mass human and animal sacrifices.

The Annual Yam Festival celebrated between September and December, reinforced bonds of loyalty and patriotism to Ashanti. It dramatized the power of the state. When yams were ready for harvest, all district chiefs including chiefs of tributary districts as well as military leaders, were required to attend the festival with their retainers. The festival provided the platform for rewarding and punishing citizens of the state. Crimes committed by notables were intentionally withheld until the festival, where they faced trial and execution to serve as an object of lesson to all. Notables who had been loyal would be presented with honors and valuable gifts by the king.

Religion 

Onyame was acknowledged to have created the visible world. In the 18th and 19th century,  had neither priestly servitude nor temples devoted to his worship. Ashanti houses included  that served as shrines for seeking solace or quietus in addressing . Onyame was the final arbiter of Justice and assigned every person his or her destiny and fate on Earth.

Ancestor veneration formed a major characteristic of Ashanti religion. The Ashanti believed that every person had an immortal soul called Kra. When death occurred, the soul was believed to leave the physical body and inhabit the land of spirits where he or she would live a life similar on Earth. It was for this reason slaves were sacrificed in order to serve their Masters in the underworld. At times, widows also demanded to be sacrificed after the death of their husband. These ancestors were believed to reward people who adhered to Ashanti values and to punish offenders. Through trade and wars of conquest, a number of Muslims from Northern Ghana formed part of Ashanti's bureaucracy. They prayed for the Asantehene and acted as medical consultants. Despite a handful of Muslims in Ashanti society, Islam did not penetrate and form a major religion in the Empire.

Folktale 
Stories of Anansi became such a prominent and familiar part of Ashanti oral culture. Tales of Anansi were encompassed into many kinds of fables. Anansi was viewed synonymous with skill and wisdom in speech. The Sasabonsam was a creature in Ashanti mythology that was believed to hate humans. The  had the appearance of the torso of a tall ape, the head and teeth of a carnivore, the underside of a snake and sometimes, the wings of a bat. It was covered in long, coarse red hair. The creature was believed to hook its feet onto trees where it hid from plain sight in order to trap and devour unsuspecting humans.

Medicine 
The Ashanti medicine was mainly herbal as diseases were tackled through medicinal plants. They tied their spiritual beliefs with the cause of diseases. According to Fynn, the common diseases among the Ashanti in the early 19th century were discovered to be lues, yaws, itches, scald heads, gonorrhea and pains in the bowels. It was testified by Dr. Teddlie who was an assistant surgeon of the Bowdich Mission on visit to Kumasi in 1817, that herbalists in Ashanti were treating all kinds of diseases and illness with green leaves, roots and barks of a lot of trees.  He observed that juices from plants were applied to cuts and bruises to stop bleeding. According to scholars such as Seth Gadzepko, the Ashanti herbalists failed to promote the importance of hygiene, diet and nutrition in the Ashanti society. The poor and children who lived in an unsanitary environment were affected the most as a result.

The Ashanti took some preventive measures against diseases. They valued sanitation and cleanliness. Rubbish of each house was burned every morning at the back of the street. Cleaning the streets and suburbs of Kumasi and the maintenance of sanitation was enforced by a bureaucratized Public Works Department. The workers of this department cleaned the streets daily and ensured that civilians had their compounds clean and weeded. They did not wear uniforms but they carried canes to signify their position. The head of this office was the  who served as the native doctor of the state and doctor of the Asantehene. There is evidence from the 19th century that the Ashanti practiced bone-setting. A fracture of an arm or leg was bound with splints. Various surgical practices were familiar in the empire. Muslim doctors in Ashanti practiced bleeding, lancing and cupping. Variolation has been recorded to be practiced by 1817. Variolation itself was common in the Gold Coast by the 18th century. There were check points at Ashanti borders that prevented people from progressing to Ashanti if they exhibited signs of smallpox. Those who discovered signs of smallpox after crossing the borders were prevented from entering Kumasi and quarantined in remote villages.

Dr. Teddlie noted that abortions of 3 months old were carried out with two plants known as the  tree, and the  plant in the native Ashanti language. These plants were powdered with pepper and the end product was boiled in fish soup. The inner back of the wawa tree was used to cure colid and other stomach pains. The bark of the oscisseree tree was used to stop dysentery and diarrhoea. The Ashanti herbalists were also able to correct stomach acidity in pregnant women, heartburn and other related discomforts. Ashanti doctors believed that anyone suffering five wounds was defiled and an endanger to others. For this reason, such persons were sacrificed. Ashanti doctors made an unsuccessful attempt to extract a bullet from the bullet wound of a British prisoner of war in the 19th century by squeezing it out of the wounded thigh with ligatures tied around the leg; one above and one below. The Ashanti also made use of medicine on the battlefield. By the late 19th century, a full time medical corps was established as a branch of the Ashanti army.

See also
Military of the Ashanti Empire
Political systems of the Ashanti Empire

References

Bibliography